Cem Bölükbaşı (born 9 February 1998) is a Turkish racing driver and former sim racer who is set to compete in the 2023 Super Formula Championship with TGM Grand Prix, having last raced in the FIA Formula 2 Championship with Charouz Racing System.

Bölükbaşı started motocross racing at the age of 5, and won the Turkish Championship a year later. Starting his professional career in esports in 2017, he joined G2 Esports FA Racing and competed in several Formula One eSports Series. He also won the inaugural championship of the Formula Renault Esport Series in 2020.

Making a switch back to real cars in May 2019, Bölükbaşı started racing in the GT4 European Series, and made his open-wheeler debut in October the same year in Formula Renault Eurocup. Throughout the first months of 2021, he competed in the F3 Asian Championship and finished as the runner-up in the rookie standings. He competed part-time in the 2021 Euroformula Open Championship and won twice. After testing Formula 2 cars at the end of 2021, he was picked to drive in the 2022 Formula 2 Championship with Charouz Racing System.

Bölükbaşı left Charouz Racing System before the Spa-Francorchamps Formula 2 round on 27 August 2022. The team argued there was a major breach of agreement from Bölükbaşı’s side, while he argued they could not reach a consensus on financial contract terms. Bölükbaşı announced that he views his withdrawal unfair.

Early and personal life 
Realizing his passion for speed when he was only 6 years old, his father took him to the motocross track. He began to compete in motocross when he was 5 years old, and won the Turkish Championship at the age of 6.

In 2022, Bölükbaşı said that his favourite Formula One driver is Fernando Alonso, adding that Alonso "as a person and his movements on track" made the Spanish driver interesting to him.

Career

Esports 
In late 2017, he was selected to join G2 Esports FA Racing, in which he would compete in various simracing competitions throughout 2018. Bölükbaşı raced for McLaren in the 2017 Formula One eSports Series, which he finished 5th in the standings with 35 points and a race win under his name. In the 2018 Formula One eSports Series, he switched to Toro Rosso and participated in 4 out of the 10 races, finishing 12th with 32 points. In the 2019 Formula One eSports Series, he participated in 9 out of the 12 races, finishing 21st with 4 points. During the 2020 lockdowns, Bölükbaşı competed in several virtual races, including winning the inaugural championship of the Formula Renault Esport Series.

GT4 
In May 2019, Borusan Otomotiv Motorsport announced that Bölükbaşı would race in the 2019 GT4 European Series. He was able to get a second-place finish in the Misano round and finished the championship in 17th overall. Bölükbaşı continued to race in the series full-time in 2020. He got 3 pole positions and 3 race wins and finished the season overall 2nd.

Lower formulae 
Bölükbaşı made his Formula debut in the 2019 Formula Renault Eurocup with M2 Competition. As a guest driver he raced only in the Hockenheim round, finishing 16th in race 1 and retiring from the second race.

Formula 3 
In January 2021, BlackArts Racing announced that Bölükbaşı would drive for the team in the 2021 F3 Asian Championship. He scored points in 13 of the 15 races and with a best race result of 5th, finished 9th in the overall standings.

He also raced in the rebranded 2022 season, this time with Evans GP. Bölükbaşı retired from all three races in round 1, with the crash in race 3 causing major damage to the rear of his car. The damage could not be repaired until the second round the week after, causing him to miss all three races. In early February, just before round 3, Bölükbaşı announced that he would not continue racing in the series, as his chances of getting FIA Super Licence points were slim.

Euroformula 

On 3 July 2021, it was announced that Bölükbaşı would join the 2021 Euroformula Open Championship with Van Amersfoort Racing. He made his debut in the series during the fourth round at Hungaroring. He won the first race in the round, becoming the first esport driver to win a race in formula series. Bölükbaşı also finished third in the second race. The third race was run on a wet track, and he finished in 7th place. 

In round 5 at Imola, he qualified third. In race 1, he ran in second place before making a mistake with three laps to go and finished third. In race 2, he started 4th as positions in the top 6 were reversed. He got into third after the start, but was later overtaken by Jak Crawford, and finished the race in 4th place. Bölükbaşı started race 3 in 7th, but collided with teammate Rafael Villagómez, causing both of them to retire.

Round 6 was at the Red Bull Ring, where Bölükbaşı started race 1 in 4th. He fell back to 5th at the start and finished the race in that position. However, he was promoted back into 4th after a post-race penalty for Reshad de Gerus. He started race 2 in third, and finished in second place behind Nazim Azman. He finished the final race of the round in 6th place. In round 7 at Monza, he started race 1 in 10th, and finished in third place, as well as getting the fastest lap. Race 2 was ran in wet conditions, and Bölükbaşı finished in second place. In race 3, he crossed the line first, but was given a three-second time penalty for cutting a corner, which demoted him to second.

In round 8 at Circuit de Barcelona-Catalunya, Bölükbaşı qualified on pole and led the race until the finish, winning his second race in the series. In race 2, he started 6th and got into 4th after the start, and finished the race in that position. He started race 3 in 5th, and also finished in 4th place. Bölükbaşı finished the season 5th in the overall standings, despite missing the first three rounds.

Formula Regional 
Bölükbaşı was signed by Evans GP to contest the first round of the 2022 Formula Regional Asian Championship. Ending the weekend by retiring in all races, his last race ended in a startline crash, which caused massive car damage. Due to the damage, he was unable to partake in the second round and later withdrew from the championship.

Formula 2 
On 14 October 2021, Bölükbaşı tested Formula Two machinery for the first time at the Brno Circuit, driving a Dallara GP2/11 which was used in the GP2 Series from 2011 to 2016 and in the FIA Formula 2 Championship in 2017. He drove a Formula 2 car for the first time in an official session during the 2021 post-season test with Van Amersfoort Racing on 18 December 2021, finishing 22nd and last. On 12 January 2022, it was officially announced that he would compete in the 2022 Formula 2 Championship as a Charouz Racing System driver.

2022 season 

For round 1 in Bahrain, Bölükbaşı qualified 20th in his first Formula 2 qualifying session. During the sprint race, he gained two positions at the start. He later overtook two more cars and finished in 14th, also ahead of Marcus Armstrong and Theo Pourchaire, both of whom retired from the race. In the feature race, Bölükbaşı gained one position at the start and was in 19th place. He pit early on lap 9 and set the fastest lap multiple times. He was running as high as 12th at one point with the undercut, but he was passed by drivers on fresher tyres. Following a late-race crash, Bölükbaşı made a pitstop under the safety car, and two other drivers having issues in the pitlane helped him to get back up into 12th. On the restart however, Bölükbaşı spun and ended the race in 15th position. During the practice session of round 2 in Jeddah, Bölükbaşı crashed into the barrier. He was hospitalized for routine checks, which resulted in him missing qualifying. It was later determined that he had suffered from a concussion, and was declared unfit to race. Charouz withdrew him from the event. During the first day of the in-season Formula 2 test in Circuit de Barcelona, Bölükbaşı crashed into a concrete wall. He missed the rest of testing and flew back to Turkey, where it was revealed that he had a broken rib. He was replaced by David Beckmann for the next round in Imola.

Bölükbaşı returned to racing in the Barcelona round. He qualified in 21st place. In the sprint race, Bölükbaşı gained five positions on the first lap and got up into 16th, but dropped down to 18th place as the race went on. In the feature race, Bölükbaşı again had a good first lap and gained seven positions. Following contact between Jehan Daruvala and Ayumu Iwasa, he got up into 12th. He came into the pits after the safety car for a tyre change but had a slow pitstop, finishing the race in 20th place. In the Monaco round, Bölükbaşı qualified 21st originally, but started the sprint race in 18th. He gained 6 positions in the first lap. He had a small contact with Richard Verschoor later in the race, but managed to finish in 12th. He was due to start in 20th in the feature race, but Roy Nissany and Liam Lawson stalling on the grid on the formation lap promoted him to 18th. He gained two more positions in lap 1. He was later overtaken by Verschoor, which dropped him to 17th. After some drivers pitted, Bölükbaşı got into 10th. He pitted under the safety car caused by Amaury Cordeel and came out in 15th. Following several retirements after the safety car, Bölükbaşı finished the race 11th.

During the Baku round, Bölükbaşı qualified in 21st place. In the sprint race, he got into 19th place by lap 10. Following crashes and safety cars, he was running in 12th at the race restart with one lap to go. Ralph Boschung and Calan Williams made contact at the back, and Bölükbaşı wasn't able to avoid the car of Williams, leading him to retire, but was still classified as 18th as he completed over 90% of the race distance. In the feature race, Bölükbaşı got into 15th place after lap 1. On lap 12, while running in 16th place, he was tapped by Roy Nissany, and collided with the barriers, causing both drivers to retire. Nissany was penalized for causing the collision and received a three place grid penalty for the following event. Bölükbaşı received a 5000 euro fine after his father had a "heated verbal exchange" and attempted a physical altercation with Nissany and his trainer after he called Bölükbaşı an "idiot" after the collision over the team radio. In the Silverstone round, Bölükbaşı qualified 20th. The sprint race was run in wet conditions. He got into 19th place by the end of lap 1, which is also where he finished the race. In the feature race, Bölükbaşı ran in 14th place during the safety car. He made an early pitstop, but had difficulties with getting the tyres to work and finished 18th.

In the Spielberg round, Bölükbaşı qualified 13th. In the sprint race, he started to have problems with his brakes after lap 2. He pitted later, and came out 5 laps behind the leaders, where he finished the race. In the feature race, he made contact with Liam Lawson, causing him to break his front wing and pit early. He didn't rejoin the track, and didn't finish the race. At the Le Castellet round, he qualified 22nd and last. Bölükbaşı started on the soft tyre, and climbed into 13th place on lap 1. He ran in that position until lap 18, when he made a mistake at the final corner and lost two positions. He finished the race 15th. In the feature race, he gained one position at the start. In the closing stages, he came into the pits and retired. At Budapest, Bölükbaşı qualified 16th. He lost a place at the start of the sprint race. On lap 15, he pitted for the soft tyre, and crossed the line in 17th place. A post-race penalty for Richard Verschoor promoted him back to 16th. In the feature race, he got into 13th place in lap 1, and later overtook Liam Lawson and Logan Sargeant as well. He finished the race in 13th place.

Bölükbaşı's contract was terminated by mutual consent ahead of the Spa-Francorchamps round, and he was replaced with Tatiana Calderón. On his sudden F2 departure, Bölükbaşı stated that financial issues forced him to part ways with Charouz.

Super Formula 
In December 2022, following his sudden Formula 2 exit, Bölükbaşı participated in a Super Formula test alongside then Formula 2 driver Liam Lawson. In March 2023, Bölükbaşı was chosen to compete in the 2023 Super Formula Championship with TGM Grand Prix.

Karting record

Karting career summary

Racing record

Esports career summary

Complete Formula One Esports Series results
(key) (Races in bold indicate pole position) (Races in italics indicate fastest lap)

Racing career summary 

† As Bölükbaşı was a guest driver, he was ineligible to score points.
* Season still in progress.

Complete Formula Renault Eurocup results 
(key) (Races in bold indicate pole position; races in italics indicate fastest lap)

Complete Formula Regional Asian Championship results 
(key) (Races in bold indicate pole position) (Races in italics indicate fastest lap)

Complete Euroformula Open Championship results 
(key) (Races in bold indicate pole position; races in italics indicate points for the fastest lap of top ten finishers)

Complete FIA Formula 2 Championship results 
(key) (Races in bold indicate pole position) (Races in italics indicate points for the fastest lap of top ten finishers)

Complete Super Formula results 
(key) (Races in bold indicate pole position; races in italics indicate fastest lap)

References

External links 
 

1998 births
Living people
Sportspeople from Istanbul
St. Joseph High School Istanbul alumni
Turkish racing drivers
F3 Asian Championship drivers
Formula Regional Asian Championship drivers
FIA Formula 2 Championship drivers
European Le Mans Series drivers
M2 Competition drivers
Van Amersfoort Racing drivers
Charouz Racing System drivers
Formula Renault Eurocup drivers
G2 Esports players
EuroInternational drivers
BlackArts Racing drivers
GT4 European Series drivers